Aqua Planet may refer to:

 Aqua Planet (water park)
 Aqua Planet (aquarium)